Saturn Girl (Imra Ardeen) is a superheroine appearing in comics published by DC Comics. A talented telepath from the 30th century, Saturn Girl is a founding member of the Legion of Super-Heroes. Imra's "Saturn Girl" title refers to her homeworld of Titan, Saturn's largest moon.

There have been three versions of Imra since her original debut, separated by the events of both the Zero Hour and Infinite Crisis limited series. Saturn Girl made her live-action debut in an episode of Smallville, and she is portrayed by actress/singer Alexz Johnson. Imra Ardeen appeared in the third season of Supergirl set in the DC Arrowverse, portrayed by Amy Jackson. In this version she is from the future and was Mon-El's wife and part of the Legion of Superheroes.

Publication history
Saturn Girl first appeared in Adventure Comics #247 (April 1958) and was created by Otto Binder and Al Plastino.

Fictional character biography

Silver Age

During the Silver Age of comics, 30th century Earth is a member of the United Planets and home to its military branch, the Science Police. The most talented telepath among a race of powerful mentalists, Imra left her homeworld of Titan to join the Science Police as a teenager. However, during her flight to Earth, an assassination attempt was made on the life of fellow passenger and billionaire R.J. Brande. Using her powers of telepathy, Imra discovered the plot, and, with the help of two other teenagers on board, Lightning Lad and Cosmic Boy, caught the assassin and saved Brande's life. At Brande's urging, she adopted the persona of Saturn Girl, and joined Lightning Lad and Cosmic Boy in founding the Legion of Super-Heroes - an organization of teenage heroes formed to honor the legacy of Superboy. They traveled back to the 20th century and gave him a place on the team after he passed their tests. When Lex Luthor and the Legion of Super-Villains were about to kill Superman, Saturn Girl offered to die in his place, although a trick by Superman made Saturn Queen save her.

As a Legionnaire, Imra gained a reputation for self-sacrifice; just prior to the leadership elections of 2975, she learned that a Legionnaire would die during an attack on Earth and decided to take on that responsibility herself. Using her telepathy, Imra forced the other Legionnaires to vote her leader and then ordered them not to use their powers during the attack, but Lightning Lad defied her orders and took her place in death. Distraught over his selfless act of devotion, Imra vowed to do all in her power to bring him back. A method was soon developed which could revive Lightning Lad, but only at the cost of another member's life. Imra again interfered in the process to ensure hers was the life taken, but her plan was foiled by Proty, the telepathic shape-shifting pet of Chameleon Boy. Proty admired Imra and tricked her so that it could take her place. Upon Proty's death, Lightning Lad was restored. Despite this series of events, Imra's leadership was highly valued in the Legion, and her position as leader, despite its means of acquisition, was allowed to stand. She earned a second term the following year. As leader of the Legion, Saturn Girl was the first female comic book character to head a group of superheroes.

Romantically, Lightning Lad (Garth Ranzz) had pursued Imra for some time, but she had repeatedly rebuffed his advances. After he sacrificed his life for her own, she understood the depth of his feelings and came to realize that she returned them. After dating for almost ten years, Garth proposed marriage but Imra initially rejected his offer due to a Legion rule which forced married members to retire. Sometime after consulting with her mentors on Titan, however, Imra relented, but the couple's retirement was short-lived; a few months after their marriage, war broke out in which all active Legionnaires were captured and the reserves were forced into action. Imra's telepathic skills were instrumental in the Legion's eventual victory, and as a result the rule barring married members was repealed. The Ranzzes returned to active duty until Imra gave birth to their son, Graym, after which they both retired to devote their energy to him. Unbeknown to the couple, Graym had a twin who was stolen at birth by Darkseid and transported into the past, where he was transformed into the monster Validus (Tales of the Legion of Super-Heroes Annual 3). Validus fought the Legion on numerous occasions (and even killed one of the comrades, the first Invisible Kid), but was eventually returned as a normal infant to his parents by Darkseid at Imra's insistence.

Imra briefly rejoined the Legion again in 2987 when Universo took control of the Earth and hypnotized and imprisoned many heroes, including her. Imra's powerful mind broke free and eventually broke Universo's hold over Earth and forced him unconscious. It was then that she realized how much the Legion was in her blood, and she rejoined, this time without Garth, who was enjoying life as a father and househusband. During the "Five Year Gap", Earth's government became hostile to the Legion, and Garth became incapacitated from the Validus plague which ravaged his native Winath. Disillusioned by the government and feeling needed more at home, Imra resigned from the Legion for the last time in 2990. Returning to Winath, she and Garth took over running a Winathian Lightning Ring plantation, which became quite prosperous. Using their new-found wealth, Imra and Garth replaced their super-heroism with simple but necessary helping of others, feeding a galaxy suffering more from hunger than from super-villains. When the Legion re-formed in 2994, the Ranzzes helped them out, but did not rejoin. Instead, they enlarged their family with the birth of daughters Dacey and Dorritt, who inherited Imra's telepathic abilities.

Post-Zero Hour

After the reboot of the Legion in the Zero Hour series, Imra remained known as Saturn Girl, and a founder of the Legion along with Cosmic Boy and the renamed Live Wire. Her design was changed from previous versions, combining some elements from past uniforms. The top and pants of her uniform are similar in design to her red and white uniform, but now colored pink instead of red, and has the familiar Saturn logo.

She was initially torn between her two fellow founders romantically, after she was left catatonic from shutting down the Composite Man's mind; as her mentor Aven was only able to restore her to an infant-like state, she demanded Garth, and it was only after he told her he needed her that she was restored to normal.

Later, after half the Legion, herself included, were stranded in the past by the Emerald Eye, she inadvertently awakens and is subsequently attacked by the misogynistic telepath known as Doctor Psycho. As a result of the attack, Cosmic Boy was knocked comatose and Psycho destroyed barriers Aven had placed on her powers, increasing them considerably. As a result, Saturn Girl would unconsciously animate the comatose Cosmic Boy and almost married him in that state before her subconscious mind rebelled, turning Cos into Garth until she shut down the link and Cosmic Boy was properly awakened.

Following Invisible Kid's resignation, she became Legion leader, and stationed Garth as part of a second group of Legionnaires on a space-station known as the Legion Outpost to avoid the appearance of nepotism; this fact irritated him for some time until the three founders went on a mission together against a corrupt regime using their identities and the Legion's symbols to prop up his regime, during which they cleared the air. Shortly thereafter, Garth proposed to her and she assented.

Both of them were among a group of Legionnaires stranded in another galaxy (Legion Lost) by a collapsing rift, during which time Imra also created a psychic projection of Apparition to stabilize Ultra Boy. When the deception was discovered, it severely strained her relationships with most of the other "Lost" Legionnaires. She resigned as leader, and soon thereafter Garth sacrificed himself to stop the mad Element Lad and allow the others to return home safely.

On their return home, her mind was strained by what she had gone through, and returned to her home moon of Titan to undergo psychic therapy. Universo then trapped her in an illusion where she had never impersonated Apparition, Element Lad was not a villain, and Live Wire had never died, to prevent her interfering as he absorbed most of the galaxy into a hivemind with himself at the center. Depressed and angry, when Sensor broke her free, she used her anger to trap Universo in a similar illusion.

Shortly thereafter, when she and Cosmic Boy visited Element Lad's home planet of Trom, they found a resurrected Garth in a crystalline version of Element Lad's body, recreated from electrified crystals Spark had found and placed there. Uncertain of how to react to him, it was some time before they reconciled properly.

"Threeboot"

With the 2005 revamp of the Legion, Imra's personal history stayed largely the same, although her powers (and those of the Titanian race) have now changed drastically. The Titanians only communicate telepathically, having lost use of their vocal cords due to centuries of evolution. It's stated, in the case of another Titanian, that somehow this type of telepathy can mimic the likeness of verbal communication, rendering a mute Titanian able to make some tongue-in-cheek humor, or change the "tone" of his telepathy according to the situation. As a result, Imra only "talks" by broadcasting her thoughts to her fellow Legion members. She is still able to read minds, but cannot express herself in spoken language, which puts her at a disadvantage in those situations where her telepathy is useless.

Imra's appearance has again changed slightly. Her new uniform is similar to her Post-Zero Hour uniform in design, but colored red instead of pink. This uniform is later changed again by M'rissey.

Imra has always been portrayed as cold, but this latest revamp further exaggerates this personality trait. She engages in emotional isolation, and has a very serious, introverted demeanor. This may, in part, be caused by shame over her muteness, which she managed to keep secret from the Legion (with the exception of Lightning Lad) for quite some time. In fact, Lightning Lad seems to be the only one Imra feels comfortable opening up to, (a nod to their Pre-Crisis relationship, and the basis for the revamping of their engagement). Her mother holds a high position in the UP Council, and was instrumental in forging the current alliance between the UP and the Legion.

Her coldness, however, is shown to hide much deeper insecurities; neglected by Lightning Lad, utterly devoting himself to the Legion cause, she always harbors feelings of inadequacy, putting all the blame for her failing relationship on her perceived lack of attractiveness, her plain personality, and her "handicap". When Ultra Boy tries to comfort her, Imra shares a moment of passion, soon discovered by her teammates, of which Lightning Lad isn't informed. Later Lightning Lad is made aware of her affair, putting a considerable strain on her relationship, leading Imra to avoid Garth for a time. Pressured by dealing with the increasing antisocial behavior of Princess Projectra, Imra is forced to admit her true feelings to him, including the possibility of having consummated her passion with Ultra Boy on the mind plane.

Using her telepathy, Imra was instrumental in locating the wraith-like form of Mon-El, hearing his telepathic pleas for help. She pursued a warm relationship with Garth, and kept in contact with her mother, even knowing that the strained relationships between the UP and the Legion mean that her mother risks her career whenever she meets her own daughter.

It's mentioned that her Legion Ring is modified to reroute mental impulses, enabling her to benefit from the improved range of communication and reply telepathically to spoken radio communication.

Post-Infinite Crisis
The events of the Infinite Crisis miniseries have apparently restored a close analogue of the Pre-Crisis on Infinite Earths Legion to continuity, as seen in "The Lightning Saga" story arc in Justice League of America and Justice Society of America, and in the "Superman and the Legion of Super-Heroes" story arc in Action Comics. Saturn Girl is included in their number. She is still married to Lightning Lad, as she is identified as Imra Ardeen-Ranzz.

Comics writer, Geoff Johns, commented on the character:

DC Rebirth
In DC Universe: Rebirth, a mysterious blonde woman (presumably Saturn Girl) is seen during a police interrogation. She has been arrested for stealing a sandwich, not realizing that food isn't free in this era. She says that she's there to speak with Superman and claims to be his friend. Even though she is told that Superman is missing and possibly dead, she smiles and replies that everything will be all right as she has seen it in the future. After the interrogation, the police officers call mental services for her. In the last panel of this scene, it is revealed that the only item in her possession was a Legion flight ring. In the "I Am Suicide" story arc of Batman, she is incarcerated in Arkham Asylum. Here, Batman and two others walk by a cell housing the blonde woman who breaths on the glass of her cell and draws the Legion of Super-Heroes symbol in the condensation. Dan DiDio of DC Comics has confirmed that the mysterious woman in the DC Universe: Rebirth and Batman issues is indeed Saturn Girl.

In the "Justice League vs. Suicide Squad" crossover, it is revealed that Emerald Empress is searching for Saturn Girl. Several years ago, she worked for Amanda Waller in the first Suicide Squad mission in return for intel on Saturn Girl. However, Waller betrays and imprisons the team after the mission. After Maxwell Lord breaks the team out, he convinces them to attack Waller and promises Emerald Empress that he can help with her search. As Emerald Empress flees when the Eye of Ekron is damaged during a battle with the Justice League and the current Suicide Squad, she says that she has to find Saturn Girl and will be trapped if the Eye breaks. In Supergirl, it is revealed that Emerald Empress is aware that she was deceived about Saturn Girl. Earlier, the Eye of Ekron received a vision created to convince Emerald Empress that Saturn Girl was the one who destroyed her life and thus had to die, but Saturn Girl showed the truth to Emerald Empress.

During "The Button" crossover arc between The Flash and Batman, still incarcerated in Arkham Asylum, Saturn Girl is watching a hockey game on the television. She realizes that one of the players will die there, which comes true, and begins screaming in distress that nothing will stop it, Superman won't come, as well as her friends and the Legion will die.

In Doomsday Clock, Saturn Girl sees Rorschach (Reggie Long) being escorted to his cell in Arkham Asylum and later breaks him out of his cell to escape the mental institution. After the escape, she reveals that she is Saturn Girl. They eventually find and save Johnny Thunder, who just found Alan Scott's green lantern and had thugs assault him, at an old steel mill. Thereafter, Saturn Girl, Johnny Thunder, and Rorschach is found by Ozymandias (who Rorschach is helping to find Doctor Manhattan) and brought aboard the Owlship. Saturn Girl tells them that her name is Imra Ardeen, that her designation is Saturn Girl, that she is a telepath from the 30th century, and that she serves as an intergalactic representative of the Legion of Super-Heroes sent to cleanse the time stream from an unknown anomaly that threatens Superman. Later, she and Johnny Thunder stay behind on the Owlship as Rorschach and Ozymandias uses the lantern to find Doctor Manhattan. After Doctor Manhattan refuses to go back and Rorschach abandons Ozymandias, Ozymandias returns to the Owlship where Saturn Girl is shocked to discover that she is able to read Ozymandias' mind as that is not supposed to happen. Hereupon, Ozymandias hits and knocks out Saturn Girl and Johnny Thunder. Ozymandias has Johnny Thunder and Saturn Girl imprisoned in his hideout. Saturn Girl fades upon no longer being part of the current timeline. When Doctor Manhattan undoes the experiment that erased the Legion of Super-Heroes and the Justice Society of America, Saturn Girl is restored.

Characterization

Appearance
In all media except for the Supergirl TV show (2015−2021), Saturn Girl is a pale-skinned humanoid being with a slim build, blonde hair, and blue or pink eyes. In the TV show, she is a green-eyed brunette, portrayed by Amy Jackson.

Powers and abilities
Saturn Girl's powers in her initial Silver Age appearances appeared to be great; she could summon distant people; probe human, electronic and animal minds; "push" weakened minds and even directly control others' thoughts and emotions. In later years, her abilities were portrayed more conservatively; her telepathy was used most often for communication or sensing surface thoughts, while her ability to influence and probe minds was usually limited to minds that had already been weakened in some way, such as by fatigue or a villain's mind control.

The post-Zero Hour Saturn Girl was again able to alter, manipulate and read minds. She could communicate mentally, as well as cast illusions and maintain them indefinitely, including pseudo-tactile contact, while the illusions could display a personality different from her own and she would be aware of all interactions the illusory figure was involved in at all times.

The extent of her powers after the "Threeboot", though unknown, is substantially more limited. Although she's retained the "soothing" effect of her powers from her Pre-Crisis incarnation, she is unable to probe shielded minds, and must concentrate to exert direct influence on an opponent's brain (such as disrupting an opponent's amygdala). Her mother (a United Planet ambassador) seems more skilled than her daughter, able to instinctively sense when Imra is using her telepathy. Titanians may choose an "open broadcast" system of communication, enabling everyone, even non-telepathic as a species, to "hear" their thoughts or a "closed broadcast", creating a sort of "astral plane" in which they can "speak" completely undetected and in absolute privacy. Imra is able to modulate her telepathic voice in various modes, including a "telepathic scream", overwhelming and compelling as a voiced one.

As described by Princess Projectra, Titanian telepathy involves mostly the control of the higher brain functions, and Imra is powerless against mental attacks dealt directly to her subconscious, or her id urgings.

Equipment
As a member of the Legion of Super-Heroes she is provided a Legion Flight Ring. It allows her to fly and protects her from the vacuum of space and other dangerous environments.

Other versions
In The Dark Knight Strikes Again, a young, precognitive girl is befriended by Catgirl. She uses the name Saturn Girl, "on account of she's not born yet", implying that this 21st-century character has some information of the 30th century and is named after the Legion's Saturn Girl.  She is a stony-eye figure who is at first keen to join Batman's growing army, but then turns the offer down when she foresees the vicious attack on Kelley by a Joker-like villain.
In Amalgam Comics Spider-Boy Team-Up #1, Saturn Girl is combined with Psylocke as Psi-Girl of the Legion of Galactic Guardians 2099. When time shifts, her rebooted form is called Psi-Girl II.

Reception

Accolades 

 In 2011, Comics Buyer's Guide ranked Saturn Girl 50th in their "100 Sexiest Women in Comics" list.
 In 2019, CBR.com ranked Saturn Girl 3rd in their "10 Most Powerful Telepaths" list, the highest rank for a female character.
 In 2022, Sportskeeda ranked Saturn Girl 5th in their "5 most powerful comic book characters with telepathic abilities" list.

In other media

Television

Live-action

 Saturn Girl (along with Cosmic Boy and Lightning Lad) appears in the Smallville episode "Legion", portrayed by Alexz Johnson. This version has a more modern outfit consisting of a jacket, pants and shirt combination, though she still had the Saturn logo on her shirt. During "Legion" she, Lightning Lad, and Cosmic Boy saved Clark Kent from Persuader and helped him defeat Brainiac in Chloe Sullivan's body, taking Brainiac's remains to be reprogrammed in the future.
 Imra Ardeen appears in the third season of Supergirl, portrayed by Amy Jackson. She is the wife of Mon-El, the two having married to secure a political alliance between Earth and Titan. She demonstrates telekinetic powers in the episode "Legion of Superheroes" when she mentally raises weights in a prison workout yard during a battle with Reign. In the episode "Of Two Minds" Imra mentions her dead sister, Preya. The goal of the Legion was to get back in the past to kill a Worldkiller Pestilence who would evolve in the future as Blight, who killed many victims, including Imra's sister. She, Brainiac 5 and Mon-El traveled to wormhole that accidentally took them 12.000 years into the past. They went into cryo-sleep and were awaken by submarine torpedo when Supergirl was stopping Morgan Edge's nefarious scheme; the DEO located them and welcomed them into their headquarters. Although she is Mon-El's wife, she (along with Brainiac 5) hides the true purpose behind the mission from Mon-El, which causes disagreements in their life and work between them. After killing the Pestilence, the future victims and her sister are alive; they attempt to return in the future, only to get back for fight against Selena and Reign. After the fight, Brainiac 5 stays in the 21st century, while Imra, Mon-El and newcomer Winslow Schott Jr. go to 31st century Earth.

Animation
 Saturn Girl appears in the Superman: The Animated Series episode "New Kids In Town", voiced by Melissa Joan Hart. She, alongside Chameleon Boy and Cosmic Boy, go back in time to stop Brainiac from killing Clark Kent before he can become Superman.
 Saturn Girl makes a non-speaking appearance in the Justice League Unlimited episode "Far From Home".

 Saturn Girl is a main character in Legion of Super-Heroes, voiced by Kari Wahlgren. After frequent appearances in the first season, Saturn Girl appeared briefly in the season 2 premiere before being put into a healing coma during a battle with Esper. She was shown recovering alongside Matter-Eater Lad, and later returned to the team.
 Saturn Girl appears in Young Justice, voiced again by Kari Wahlgren.

Film
 Saturn Girl (along with Cosmic Boy and Lightning Lad) appears in Lego DC Comics Super Heroes: Justice League – Cosmic Clash, voiced again by Kari Wahlgren. Aiding Batman in 2116, they distracted Brainiac/Superman long enough to allow Batman to return to the Batcave in Gotham City. Saturn Girl provided the illusion to make Brainiac/Superman think it killed the Legion of Super-Heroes. They also gave Batman their last remaining Time Sphere, allowing him to return to the present.
 Saturn Girl appeared in the 2019 DC Universe Animated Original Movie Justice League vs. the Fatal Five, voiced by Tara Strong.

Video games
 In Injustice 2, Saturn Girl and other members of the Legion of Superheroes are seen in Brainiac's ending where Brainiac 5 posed as the former to defeat him. While they grilled him for going back in time to stop Brainiac, they are pleased that he stopped Brainiac's rampage.
In DC Universe Online, Saturn Girl appears in the episode "Long Live the Legion" taking place in the 31st century, both as an ally, and as an enemy while under the control of Emerald Empress.

References

Comics characters introduced in 1958
DC Comics aliens
DC Comics extraterrestrial superheroes
DC Comics female superheroes
DC Comics characters who have mental powers
Fictional empaths
DC Comics telepaths
Fictional mute characters
Characters created by Otto Binder
Superman characters